Son Hyung-sun (Korean: 손형선; born February 22, 1964 South Korea) is a South Korean former footballer who played as a defender.

He started professional career at Daewoo Royals in 1986.

He was winner of K League Best XI in 1988 K League.

References

External links 
 

1964 births
Living people
Association football defenders
Busan IPark players
Pohang Steelers players
FC Seoul players
South Korean footballers
Kwangwoon University alumni
Place of birth missing (living people)